Goodenia robusta, commonly known as woolly goodenia, is a species of flowering plant in the family Goodeniaceae and is endemic to southern Australia. It is an erect or ascending perennial herb with crowded, hairy, elliptic to narrow oblong leaves at the base of the plant, and racemes of yellow flowers.

Description

Taxonomy and naming
Woolly goodenia was first formally described in 1868 by George Bentham in Flora Australiensis and given the name Goodenia geniculata var. robusta.

In 1912, Kurt Krause raised the variety to species status as G. robusta in Das Pflanzenreich. In 1990, Roger Charles Carolin selected the specimens collected in the Marble Range  by Johann Wilhelmi as the lectotype. The specific epithet (robusta) means "robust".

Distribution and habitat
Goodenia robusta grows in mallee and woodland in the south-east of South Australia and in the Little and Big Deserts of Victoria.

References

robusta
Flora of South Australia
Flora of Victoria (Australia)
Plants described in 1868
Taxa named by George Bentham